The 1873 Victorian football season was an Australian rules football competition played during the winter of 1873. The season consisted of matches between metropolitan and provincial football clubs in the colony of Victoria.

1873 premiership 
Four metropolitan clubs participated in senior football during the 1873 season: Albert-park,  and University, but since University played too few games, its record is not shown below.

Notable for its absence was South Yarra; after being a powerhouse of the 1860s, the club folded in July 1873. Many of its players went to the nearby and newly established junior club, St Kilda, which was elevated to senior ranks in 1874.

Carlton and Melbourne were considered the dominant clubs in the city, so the premier club was decided based entirely on the head-to-head record between the clubs: in their four meetings, Carlton won two and two were drawn, so Carlton was recognised as the premier club for the season.

Club senior records 
The below table shows the results for senior clubs during the 1873 season. The list shows club records across all matches (senior, junior, and at odds), but excludes abandoned matches played by Carlton against Albert-park and University.

 was the strongest provincial team, being undefeated in provincial matches and suffering its only loss of the season against Melbourne. According to the official tables published in the Argus from 1889 and in the Football Record from 1912–1923, Geelong was the third-placed club in the Victorian premiership in 1873.

Of the long list of junior clubs to compete at relatively even standard – Carlton Imperial, Collingwood, East Melbourne, Hawthorn, Richmond, Southern, South-park, Studley-park and Williamstown – there was no clear premier club, with none managing an unbeaten record in matches against the other juniors. The numbers advantage to juniors clubs in matches at odds against senior clubs was reduced in 1873, with the junior club usually fielding eighteen men to the senior club's twenty.

Notable events 
 From 1873, clubs began wearing distinctive uniforms to assist in distinguishing between the two teams. Prior to 1873, the colour of the players' caps was usually the only distinguishing feature.
 The sole match between Carlton and Albert-park was abandoned when Carlton disputed the umpire's decision to award a mark to Albert-park in front of goal. Albert-park refused to play another match against Carlton during the year following the incident.

External links 
 History of Australian rules football in Victoria (1853-1900)

References 

Australian rules football competition seasons
1873 in sports
1873 in Australian sport
Victoria